Jeong Jin-woon (Hangul: 정진운), most often credited as Jinwoon, is a South Korean singer and actor. Debuting as a member of the group 2AM in July 2008, he began his acting career in 2012 with the KBS series Dream High 2, playing Jin Yoo-jin.

Biography 
Jinwoon was born on May 2, 1991 in Seoul, South Korea.
He graduated high school from BaekAhm High School. He, along with Shinee's Onew and Girls' Generation's Seohyun, had the highest national score for their high school SATs exam. He studied at Daejin University, Dept. of Theatre and Visual Arts, the same class as fellow group member, Seulong. Jinwoon is known to be close to 91-liners, such as Nicole Jung former member of Kara, Son Dong-woon of Beast, Mir of MBLAQ, Key of Shinee, and Seohyun of Girls' Generation. On October 7, 2013, he suffered a car accident and went into surgery. The surgery went well and currently he is going through a recovery process.

His cousin, Park Mi So, was a member of a South Korean Kpop girl group "TAHITI".

Career

2AM
He was originally eliminated from 2 am in the Hot Blood documentary, but Jinwoon eventually returned after one of the chosen members Daehun had to return to the States for personal reasons. Prior to debut, he was in a band called "No Comment". He plays guitar, drums, bass guitar, bongo and piano.

Solo Promotions
On August 7, 2011, the music video of his first solo single, "You Walking Towards Me" was released by Big Hit Entertainment. Jinwoon wrote and composed the song. It also features mixing by engineer Michael Brauer. Jinwoon held his debut stage last month at the Jisan Valley Rock Festival, where he performed "You Walking Towards Me". His limited single (1,000 copies) went on sale on August 4. Also included on the single was another song he composed, "Lalala".

This was followed by another two-single mini-album, which includes the songs "Now or Never" and "Psycho", which he wrote. On November 8, Jinwoon pleased the fans by allowing his song "Psycho" to be downloaded for free. The album and music video were released November 17.

On November 25, he held his first solo concert at Hongdae V Hall in Seoul. To help establish his 'rocker roots', he received mentorship from veteran rock band YB, vocalist Yoon Do Hyun, and bassist Park Tae Hee. Big Hit Entertainment revealed on November 15, "Jinwoon successfully completed a joint production with Yoon Do Hyun's Band, who he's admired for a long time. Through his concert, Jinwoon will deviating from his 2 am image to show a new "rocker" side to his personality."

On February 29, 2012 he released his OST song "We Are The B" for KBS's Dream High 2 together with Kang So-ra, Jinyoung and Kim Ji Soo.

He was then featured in his friend Nicole Jung's solo track "Lost" in Kara Collection, both in Korean and Japanese.

Acting
In 2009, he made an appearance on the television series Family Needed.

He was hosting M.net's M! Countdown along with bandmate Jo Kwon in 2010.

He was cast for KBS's Drama Dream High Season 2 in 2012 as one of the main character Jin Yoojin, who dreams of becoming a rock star that attends Kirin Art School.

Jinwoon paired with Go Jun Hee in We Got Married in 2013.

Jinwoon being MC Music Bank with Park Se Young since April 12, 2013 until he got car accident and promote Park Seo Joon to replace him.

He was cast as Han Yeo Reum in TVN's drama Marriage Over Dating in 2014.

He played Choi Seung-chan, a former rookie rising baseball star, in the South Korean television series called Madame Antoine: The Love Therapist, which was released in January 2016.

Discography

Single albums

Singles

Soundtrack appearances

Filmography

Film

Television series

Television shows

Web shows

Music video appearances

Awards and nominations

References

External links 

1991 births
Living people
2AM (band) members
JYP Entertainment artists
K-pop singers
Mystic Entertainment artists
South Korean male idols
South Korean male television actors
South Korean pop singers
21st-century South Korean male singers